Southeastern District may refer to:

Southeastern District (Church of the Brethren)
Southeastern District of the Lutheran Church–Missouri Synod
Southeastern District (VHSL), of the Virginia High School League